Klimovich is an East Slavic language surname. Polish language equivalent: Klimowicz, Lithuanian language equivalent: Klimavičius.

Notable people with the surname include:

 Dmitri Klimovich (footballer born 1972) (born 1972), Belarusian football defender
 Dzmitry Klimovich (born 1984), Belarusian football defender
  (1907–1989), Soviet orientalist and Islamic scholar
 Sergei Klimovich (born 1974), retired Russian professional ice hockey center

See also 
 Klimkovich

Belarusian-language surnames
Russian-language surnames